Croomia pauciflora is a plant species native to Florida, Alabama, Georgia and Louisiana. Croomia pauciflora is generally found in rich loams in forests.

C. pauciflora is a perennial herb spreading by underground rhizomes. It has scale-like leaves around the base, and 3-6 cordate to elliptical green leaves at the tip of the stem. The greenish flowers are borne in a cyme.

The specific epithet pauciflora is Latin for 'few-flowered'.

References

Flora of the Southeastern United States
Stemonaceae
Plants described in 1834
Flora without expected TNC conservation status